Dmitrijs Jurkevičs (born 7 January 1987 in Daugavpils) is a Latvian track and field athlete who specialises in middle-distance running. He holds the Latvian record in 1500 metres.

He competed over 1500 metres at the 2005 European Athletics Junior Championships and came sixth in the final. He was a semi-finalist in the 800 metres and the 2006 World Junior Championships in Athletics. He set an 800 m best of 1:46.44 minutes in Sollentuna in 2008 and improved his 1500 m best to 3:39.69 minutes the following year. In his senior world debut, he was eliminated in the 800 m heats at the 2009 World Championships in Athletics. He began to focus on running the 1500 m from 2010 onwards, and he represented Latvia in that event at the 2010 European Athletics Championships. He achieved a Latvian record over 1500 m in Prague in June 2011 and bettered that mark by over a second and a half to 3:37.35 minutes at the Sollentuna Grand Prix a few weeks later.  He represented Latvia at the 2012 Summer Olympics in the men's 1500 m.

Achievements

Personal bests

References

External links
 
 
 
 
 

1987 births
Living people
Sportspeople from Daugavpils
Latvian male middle-distance runners
Athletes (track and field) at the 2012 Summer Olympics
Olympic athletes of Latvia
Competitors at the 2007 Summer Universiade
Competitors at the 2011 Summer Universiade
Competitors at the 2013 Summer Universiade